WDCR (88.9 MHz) is an FM radio station licensed to Oreana, Illinois and owned by St. Mary's Hospital in Decatur. It broadcasts to the Decatur area on 88.9 MHz from a tower near Oreana, Illinois.  It mostly airs content from Relevant Radio.  It began broadcasting on May 25, 2011.

External links
WDCR online

2011 establishments in Illinois
DCR
Macon County, Illinois
Radio stations established in 2011